Route 142 is a highway in southern Missouri.  Its eastern terminus is at Route 53 in southern Poplar Bluff; its western terminus is at Route 101 in Bakersfield.  Route 142 is the southernmost east–west highway in the south-central part of the state.  Despite its length, there are relatively few towns on the route.

Major intersections

References

142
Transportation in Howell County, Missouri
Transportation in Oregon County, Missouri
Transportation in Ripley County, Missouri